Florentin-Constantin Pera (born 18 November 1979) is a Romanian professional handball manager and former player. He has been the manager of the Romania national team since 2022.

Trophies

Manager
SCM Râmnicu Vâlcea
Liga Națională: 2019
Cupa României: 2020
Supercupa României: 2018, 2020

References

1979 births
Living people
Sportspeople from Reșița
Romanian male handball players
Romanian handball coaches
Romanian expatriate sportspeople in Russia 
Handball coaches of international teams